Lode Wyns is a Belgian molecular biologist and professor at the Vrije Universiteit Brussel (Brussels, Belgium). He is head of the VIB Department of Molecular and Cellular Interactions, Vrije Universiteit Brussel of the VIB. His research interest is on immunology, with an emphasis on cellular and applied immunology with major ramifications into parasitology and on structural biology such as protein structure, function and design.

Lode Wyns obtained a PhD from the Vrije Universiteit Brussel in 1977 and is Professor at the Faculty of Science since 1993. He is Scientific Director of the VIB Department of Molecular and Cellular Interactions, Vrije Universiteit Brussel since 1996.

References
 Dumoulin M, Last AM, Desmyter A, Decanniere K, Canet D, Larsson G, Spencer A, Archer DB, Sasse J, Muyldermans S, Wyns L, Redfield C, Matagne A, Robinson CV, Dobson CM, A camelid antibody fragment inhibits the formation of amyloid fibrils by human lysozyme, Nature 424, 783–788, 2003

Sources
 VIB Department of Molecular and Cellular Interactions
 ULTR (Vrije Universiteit Brussel)

Belgian molecular biologists
Flemish scientists
Vrije Universiteit Brussel alumni
Living people
Year of birth missing (living people)